The Alpine is a medium to large sized breed of domestic goat known for its very good milking ability. They have no set colours or markings (although certain markings are discriminated against). They have horns, a straight profile and erect ears.

The breed originated in the French Alps.  Mature does weigh around 61 kg (135 lbs), and are about 76 cm (30 in) tall at the shoulder. Alpine goats can range from white or gray to brown and black. Alpine goats are heavy milkers. The milk can be made into butter, cheese, soap, ice cream or any other dairy product normally made from cow's milk. They are often used for commercial dairy production, as well as homestead milk goats.

Types 
Several sub-types of Alpine goats have emerged, namely:

 Purebred (French) Alpines: the original type from the French Alps
 American Alpines: Alpines with other genetic influences after their introduction to the United States. American Alpines have much of the visual type and temperament as French Alpines, but may have less standard markings or conformation due to crossbreeding.

Characteristics
Alpine goats are a medium to large sized breed. Males are over 81 cm (32 in) tall at the withers and females are over 76 cm (30 in) tall at the withers. Their hair is short to medium in length, and they come in all colours and combinations of colours. They have erect ears and a straight profile, and are described as being "alertly graceful" with the ability to adapt to any climate thanks to their hardy nature. They are the only breed with erect ears that comes in all colours and combinations of colours.

The sexual maturation rate among Alpine goats is at four to five months after birth for buck kids, and five to six months after birth for doe kids. However, doe kids should not be bred until they are at least 75-80 lbs. A doe’s gestation lasts for 145 – 155 days, with 150 being the average. Twins are the most common, but they can have singles, all the way up to quintuplets .

Alpine goats are friendly and highly curious, however they can be independent and strong-willed.

The American Dairy Goat Association faults all-white and Toggenburg patterned individuals.

History 
Alpines goats originated in the French Alps.

Milk 

Known for its milk, the Alpine goat is famous for its rich dairy production. Alpine goats are extremely popular in the dairy industry for their docile temperament, high quality milk output and long lactation. Alpine milk has relatively low fat content, with an average fat percent of 3.4%. It is higher in sugars than cows' milk but balances itself in terms of the amount of protein. Alpine goats' milk has 2.3 g of protein per 250 ml while cow’s milk has 3.4. A higher protein count is not always good, since it packs more calories with an increased fat content. Compared to Saanen goat milk, it is higher in all nutritional aspects, except the fat content, making it a much healthier choice.

Alpine goats are one of the top milk producers, alongside Saanen and Toggenburg goats. They are distinct from the other two due to their low value of fat content. This could be a direct correlation between the weight of the animal and its habitual environment. However, the Nubian goat's weight is similar to that of the Alpines at maturity, yet it produces less milk, containing a higher proportion of fat, than the Alpine goats.

The peak periods for milk production occur after four to six weeks of parturition (kidding). The optimal weight at which a goat produces optimal milk production is at least 130 pounds. For the Alpine goat that number is higher at 135 pounds and produces 2,134 pounds of milk per lactation. Good nutrition, proper milking procedures, reproductive management, and disease control are also factors that contribute to milk production of the Alpine Goat.

There are four requirements that need to be efficient for optimal dairy production. Dairy goats must be housed in specific conditions so that their milk production is not alarmed by changes. Changes in external factors can cause a decrease in milk production due to the pressure applied on the goat to adapt to these changes. The four factors for optimal production are: adequate ventilation, dry beds, uncontaminated feeder and water supply, minimal labor and disturbance.

Alpine milk, as with all goat milk, must be filtered and chilled immediately upon separation from the lactating doe when intended for human consumption. Cooling is required immediately of the milk so that there is no excess bacteria growth. Warm bacteria grows at a faster rate and multiplies so that the milk is spoiled. The milk that is refrigerated has a shelf life of about three to four weeks. Freezing the milk increases its shelf life by about four to five weeks.

References

External links

Alpine Goats

Goat breeds
Dairy goat breeds
Goat breeds originating in France
Protein requirements for goats 
Pregnancy Toxemia - Ketosis in Goats